Olmotega cinerascens is a species of beetle in the family Cerambycidae, and the only species in the genus Olmotega. It was described by Pascoe in 1864.

References

Acanthocinini
Beetles described in 1864
Monotypic beetle genera